Douglas is a village situated by the Rio Hondo river in Orange Walk District, Belize, 12 miles from Orange Walk Town. According to the 2010 census, there were 122 households in Douglas with a population of 521 people, 270 males and 250 females consisting mostly from people of Maya Mestizo (Yucatec Maya) descent.

References

Populated places in Orange Walk District